Alfred Parish Stone (June 28, 1813 – August 2, 1865) was a U.S. Representative from Ohio.

Biography
Born in Worthington, Massachusetts, Stone attended the common schools. He married Anna Townsend of Buffalo, New York.  In 1832, he moved to Columbus, Ohio, and engaged in mercantile pursuits.

Stone was elected as a Democrat to the Twenty-eighth Congress to fill the vacancy caused by the death of Heman A. Moore and served from October 8, 1844, to March 3, 1845.  He was not a candidate for renomination.  He was appointed Ohio State Treasurer by Governor Salmon P. Chase in 1857 to fill the vacancy caused by the resignation of William H. Gibson.  He was elected and reelected to the same office as a Republican and served until 1862.   He was appointed as collector of internal revenue for the Columbus district of Ohio in 1862 and served until his death in Columbus, Ohio, August 2, 1865. Stone was found dead at the graves of his two children at Green Lawn Cemetery. He was interred in Green Lawn Cemetery. In 1888 his remains were removed to Forest Lawn Cemetery in Buffalo, New York.

Notes

References

1813 births
1865 deaths
People from Worthington, Massachusetts
Ohio Republicans
State treasurers of Ohio
Politicians from Columbus, Ohio
Burials at Green Lawn Cemetery (Columbus, Ohio)
Burials at Forest Lawn Cemetery (Buffalo)
19th-century American politicians
Democratic Party members of the United States House of Representatives from Ohio